The 110th Salman Farsi Special Operations Brigade is an SOF Takavar unit of the Islamic Revolutionary Guard Corps Ground Forces based in the city of Zahedan, in the province of Sistan and Baluchistan. The brigade is currently commanded by Brigadier General Hossein Almasi and part of the "Qods sector headquarters" in southeastern Iran.

History 
The brigade originated in 1986 as a battalion of the 41st Tharallah Division, taking part in the Iran-Iraq war. After the war, it became its own brigade in 2011, and in 2015, following necessary special training, the brigade was declared a special operations Takavar brigade. Since then, it has taken part in combating the insurgency in Sistan and Baluchistan province from its base in the city of Zahedan, as well as partaking in the Iranian involvement in the Syrian civil war.

Assassination attempts

April 2017 
On 10 April 2017, reports emerged that two gunman with unclear organizational affiliation had assassinated Ruhollah A’ali, a battalion commander in the 110th brigade. The two gunman were reportedly killed by Basij fighters in the ensuing combat. While the identity of the perpetrators was not disclosed, the Islamic State had released a video threatening Iranian forces only days prior, leading some to speculate that they were responsible for the attack.

April 2022 
On 23 April 2022, the Qods sector headquarters announced that 4 gunmen had ambushed the car of 110th brigade commander Hossein Almasi at a military checkpoint near Zahedan, killing one of his bodyguards named Mahmoud Absalan but failing to assassinate the commander. While blame for the assassination attempt was not officially put on any party, some Iranian media networks held the Mossad responsible for the attack.

See also 
Special forces of Iran
Saberin Takavar Brigade
33rd Al-Mahdi Airborne Brigade

References 

Special forces of Iran
Islamic Revolutionary Guard Corps